The Attorney-General of Victoria, in formal contexts also Attorney-General or Attorney General for Victoria, is a minister in the Government of Victoria, Australia. The Attorney-General is a senior minister in the state government and the First Law Officer of the State.

The current Attorney-General of Victoria has, since December 2020, been Jaclyn Symes of the Australian Labor Party. The Attorney-General is one of the ministers who administer parts of the Victorian Department of Justice and Community Safety, with responsibility for the state's courts and tribunals.

Bill Slater served as Attorney-General of Victoria 6 separate times and Arthur Rylah holds the record for the longest term of 11 years and 334 days.

List of attorneys-general of Victoria

See also

 Justice ministry
 Politics of Victoria

References

Victoria
 
Attorney-General of Victoria